Caloptilia magnifica is a moth of the family Gracillariidae. It is known from the southern Alps and former Yugoslavia, and a subspecies of Japan.

The wingspan is 10.5–11 mm.

The larvae of subspecies magnifica feeds on Epimedium alpinum, while subspecies moriokensis feeds on Epimedium grandiflorum var. thunbergianum. They mine the leaves of their host plant. The mine starts as a long, lower-surface, strongly branching, epidermal, corridor. Later, deeper layers of tissue are eaten and the mine develops into a tentiform mine with dispersed frass. Older larvae leave the mine and make a marginal roll on another leaf, almost always folded downwards. This leaf is eaten out from the inside. Pupation takes place in a yellowish white cocoon that is made at the margin usually of the same leaf.

Subspecies
Caloptilia magnifica magnifica (Europe)
Caloptilia magnifica moriokensis Kumata, 1982 (Japan (Honshū))

References

magnifica
Moths of Japan
Moths of Europe
Moths described in 1867